"Why Not Nothing?" and "Sweet Brother Malcolm" are songs by English singer-songwriter Richard Ashcroft and are featured on his 2006 album, Keys to the World. The two songs were released on 4 December 2006 as a limited edition double A-sided 7-inch single from that album (see 2006 in British music).

Track listing
Both songs written by Richard Ashcroft.
"Why Not Nothing?" – 4:09
"Sweet Brother Malcolm" – 4:51

Music video
The music video for "Why Not Nothing?" was directed by Max Dodson and features the Perspex Confession Box, which was the original working title for the album Keys to the World.

At the end of the video, Richard puts his guitar on the floor and the start of Music Is Power can be heard in the background.

References

External links
Richard Ashcroft – official website.
musicOMH.com track review

2006 singles
2006 songs
Parlophone singles
Richard Ashcroft songs
Song recordings produced by Chris Potter (record producer)